The Flying Dutchman (1846–1870) was an English Thoroughbred racehorse and sire. He raced for four seasons between 1848 and 1851, winning all but one of his fifteen races, including The Derby and the St Leger. On his final racecourse appearance he defeated Voltigeur in what was probably the most celebrated match race in the history of British thoroughbred racing, known as The Great Match. He went on to be a success at stud both in Britain and France, where he died in 1870. The Flying Dutchman was regarded by experts as one of the greatest British racehorses of the nineteenth century.

Background
The Flying Dutchman, bred at Kirkleatham in Yorkshire, was a dark bay or "brown" horse standing 15.3 hands high. He had a strong back, deep shoulders, powerful hindquarters, good bone, and was a bit "over at the knee" (as were many of his offspring). The roman-nosed animal also had an exceptional stride, a quiet temper and a "fiery eye".

The Flying Dutchman was by Bay Middleton, who won every race in his two seasons on the turf until he was retired due to a problem with one of his forelegs. During that time, the colt won the Riddleton Stakes, the Bruton Street Stakes, the 2,000 Guineas, the Buckhust Stakes at Ascot, the Grand Duke Michael Stakes, The Derby (against Gladiator, Venison and Slane), and his final race, a match against and Muezzin. Bay Middleton was by Sultan, winner of the Derby, and out of The Oaks winning mare Cobweb. Bay Middleton also sired Aphrodite (winner of the 1,000 Guineas), The Hermit (2000 Guineas), Andover (Derby), and Fly By Night. As a broodmare-sire, he produced Ellen Middleton, and dams of Wild Dayrell, Saunterer, Mainstone, Sunbeam, and Mainbrace. He was the Leading sire in Great Britain and Ireland in 1844 and 1849.

The Flying Dutchman was out of the 15-hand mare Barbelle. She was by the stallion Sandbeck, who won the 1823 Club Stakes at Doncaster and 1824 York's Fitzwilliam Stakes, and produced the colt Redshank. Her other offspring included Van Tromp (by Lanercost), who was quite successful on the turf and at stud. His success led to Lord Eglinton's decision to agree to purchase any of her future foals £1,000. He thus became the owner of Barbelle's 1846 colt foal. The Flying Dutchman was sent into training with John Fobert at Middleham.

Racing career

1848: two-year-old season
The Flying Dutchman was undefeated in five races as a two-year-old in 1848. He won the July Stakes at Newmarket and a £400 Sweepstakes at the same course. At Liverpool he won a Sweepstakes for £1400. In autumn he appeared at Doncaster where he won the Champagne Stakes and one other race. His winnings for the season were £4,095.

1849: three-year-old season
As a three-year-old, The Flying Dutchman did not race before The Derby and was rumoured to be less than fully fit. He nevertheless started joint-favourite with Tadmor for the race at odds of 2/1 in a field of twenty-six runners. Ridden by Charles Marlow he led after half a mile but was overtaken in the straight by the outsider Hotspur, who was travelling strongly in the havey, muddy ground. Marlow had to use the whip twice (the only time the whip was used on The Flying Dutchman in his career) to ensure that he regained the lead and won by half a length over, with Tadmor third. Lord Eglinton won heavily in betting on the race, and members of the Army and Navy Club ("The Rag") of which he was a member, reportedly took £30,000 in winning bets. John Fobert celebrated by holding a feast for a hundred poor families at Middleham. King William III of the Netherlands who was a great admirer of The Flying Dutchman, presented Fobert with a "magnificent breast-pin" in the shape of a horseshoe to commemorate the victory.

He had walk-overs when no rivals opposed him in his next two races, the Produce Stakes and the Bickerstaff Stakes, both at Liverpool. He returned on 12 September for the St Leger at Doncaster, in which he started 4/9 favourite against nine rivals. Although many of fashionable visitors were deterred by the poor weather, the race attracted a huge crowd, with many arriving by rail for the first time. The Flying Dutchman was held up in the early stages before making steady progress to turn into the straight in second place behind Vatican. The favourite took the lead a furlong from the finish and won very easily by two lengths in a time of 3:20.0 from the 2000 Guineas winner Nunnykirk who finished strongly to deprive Vatican of second. A few days later he had another walk-over in the Foal Stakes. He then won by forfeit, for £500, after Honeycomb (also by Bay Middleton) was withdrawn from a scheduled match race between the two: this win is not part of the Flying Dutchman's official race record. He finished the season with the Belvoir Stakes, winning by eight lengths.

1850: four-year-old season
At four, The Flying Dutchman first won the two and a half mile Emperor of Russia's Plate by eight lengths at Royal Ascot in June. He then won the 29-furlong Goodwood Stakes for four-year-olds by 10 lengths in July.

It wasn't until the Doncaster Cup that he was defeated in a two-horse race, by the 1850 Derby winner Voltigeur who had won St. Leger two days before. It is possible that The Flying Dutchman's defeat was due to the fact that the horse was not properly conditioned, since his trainer had thought that Voltigeur would forfeit. Another factor was the behaviour of jockey, Marlow, who had been drinking and ignored instructions to wait on the colt, instead crying "Ill show you what I've got under me today!" and pushing him at break-neck speed at the beginning of the race. Having started the race at odds of 2/11, The Flying Dutchman's odds in running shortened to 1/10 as he pulled progressively further ahead of his rival. His stamina, however, was being used up and although he held the lead into the straight Voltigeur, receiving nineteen pounds, wore him down to win by half a length. It was decided to scrap the original plan of retiring The Flying Dutchman after the Doncaster, and instead run him in a match race against Voltigeur to try to regain his reputation.

1851: five-year-old season

The Great Match

The two-mile race was held at York on 31 May 1851, for a purse of 1,000 sovereigns. The weights for the match were set by Henry John Rous, who decided that The Flying Dutchman should carry 120½ pounds to Voltigeur's 112. The race between the two Yorkshire horses generated enormous public interest, drawing an estimated 100,000 spectators, the largest crowd to the Knavesmire since the execution of Eugene Aram in 1759. Even the horses' exercise gallops attracted large crowds of fans attempting to assess their relative condition. On the day of the race the crowd was divided into partisan camps, cheering for either "Volti" or "The Flyer". The Flying Dutchman was successfully restrained in the early stages as Voltigeur made the running. In the final furlong the Flying Dutchman moved up level with his rival and then pulled ahead to win by a length. He was then retired to stud.

Stud record
During his first few years at stud, The Flying Dutchman stood at Rawcliffe Paddocks, for a fee of 30 guineas. He was later sold in 1858, for a sum of 150,000 francs, to Napoleon III's National Stud and stood there until his death in 1870. In England, The Flying Dutchman produced very little of merit, despite covering a great number of mares for that time (50 mares in his first season). He was one of the top sires from 1855 to 1862, making it up to second place in 1860 and 1861 mainly due to his filly, Flying Duchess. During this time he also sired Derby winner Ellington, some good broodmares, and good jumping horses. In France, he sired Dollar, and many other top race horses, making his time there much more successful than his breeding career in England. Additionally, his blood was sent to Australia and New Zealand through granddaughter Mermaid.

Notable progeny
 Brown Duchess: 1858 filly, won the Two Year Old Stakes, the New Stakes, St. Helen's Purse, Liverpool Cup, Stanley Stakes, and Filly Stakes and placed in the Queen's Plate, Stamford Plate, and Two Year Old Plate as a two-year-old. At three, won the Epsom Oaks, Stanley Stakes, Yorkshire Oaks, Grand Duke Michael Stakes, and Queen's Plate, dead-heated in the Doncaster Cup, and was third in the One Thousand Guineas. Dam of Visionary (by Loup-garou), Noblesse, and Berggeist. 
 Deliane: 1862 filly, won the French Oaks, dam of Enguerrande (dead-heated in Epsom Oaks, won the French One Thousand Guineas and the Prix de Villebon, second in the Grand Prix de Paris and the Prix du Jockey Club) and La Jonchere (won the Prix de Diane, the Prix Daru and the Prix des Cars), and Xaintrailles (won the Prendergast Stakes, the French Two Thousand Guineas, and the Grand Poule des Produits).
 Dollar: 1860 colt, won the Prix de la Société d'Encouragement (2,200 Metres), Prix Principal (4,000 Metres), the Grand Prix de l'Empereur (Prix Lupin), Grand Prix de l'Imperatrice (Prix Rainbow), the Brighton Cup, Great Northamptonshire Handicap, and Goodwood Cup, and ran second in the Prix du Jockey Club (French Derby). Record of 19: 8-5-3. Influential sire in France, with progeny including Sea Sick, Omnium II, Bruleur, Ksar (winner of the French Derby), Tourbillon (winner of the French Derby), Ossian (winner of St. Leger), Upas (French Derby), and Androclès.
 Dutch Skater: 1866 colt, a stayer, won the Warwick Cup, the Great Metropolitan Handicap, the Doncaster Cup, and the 6,200-metre Prix Gladiateur all at age six. His get include Insulaire (winner of the French Derby, Ascot Derby, Claret Stakes, Queen Alexandra Stakes; second in the Two Thousand Guineas, Epsom Derby, Grand Prix de Paris, Sussex Stakes, Newmarket St. Leger, Jockey Club Cup), the filly Dutch Oven (won 9 races at 2yo, and the Doncaster St. Leger, Yorkshire Oaks, and Great Foal Stakes at 3) and Yellow (won the Prix de L'Avenir, the Prix à Bade, the Grand Prix du Jubilee, the Biennial, the Prix Hocquart and the Prix de Fontainebleau; sired Grand Steeplechase de Paris winner Dandolo). 
 Ellington: 1853 colt, only Epsom Derby winner that was sired by The Flying Dutchman. Was a poor sire, although a good show horse following his retirement from racing.
 Flying Duchess: 1853 filly, dam of the great racehorse and sire Galopin.
 Guildermire: 1855 filly, won the Champagne Stakes, placed in the Eglinton Stakes, dead-heated in the Oaks (but lost the run-off).
 Ignoramus: 1854 colt, won Prince of Wales's Stakes, third in Fitzwilliam Stakes, and won a number of plates. 
 Pennace: 1857 filly, descendants include Ajax, Double Life, Precipitation, and Persian Gulf.
 Peter Wilkins: Exported to Australia where he was the damsire of the versatile Malua.
The Flying Dutchman bloodline carries through his two daughters the Flying Dutchess and the Dutchmans Daughter to Galopin and Man o War and to many excellent horses of more current periods of racing including Secretariat, Ruffian, Affirmed, Barbaro and Forego.
In fact every Triple Crown Winner can trace back to the Flying Dutchman in their pedigree.

Assessment
In May 1886 The Sporting Times carried out a poll of one hundred experts to create a ranking of the best British racehorses of the 19th century. The Flying Dutchman was ranked sixth, having been placed in the top ten by forty-nine of the contributors. He was the highest-placed horse to have raced before 1850.

Pedigree

Sire line tree

The Flying Dutchman
Ellington
Delight
Fly-By-Night
Peter Wilkens
The Quack
Benvolio
Flying Pieman
Old England
New Holland
Ignoramus
Purston
Sir Watkin
Bide-a-Wee
Amsterdam
Duneany
Glenbuck
The Rover
Cape Flyaway
Good Hope
Tom Bowline
Make Haste
Winton
Young Dutchman
Ellerton
Romulus
Walloon
Dollar
Dami
Il Maestro
Salvanos
Androcles
Cambyse
Callistrate
Kosroes
Kerym
Gardefeu
Chouberski
Bruleur
Priori
Tutor
The Grasshopper
Ksar
Arbaces
Codoman
Saint Cyr
Pastisson
Xeny
Salvator
Elzevir
Ossian
Fountainebleau
Phlegathon
Jouancy
Patriarche
Gettatore
Lutin
Kadikoi
Hautbois
Beau Page
Thieusies
Greenback
Prologue
Vin Sec
Vignemale
Gil Peres
Aigle Royal
Merlin
Qui Vive
Caudeyran
Louis D'Or
Saumur
Clamart
Cimier
Garrick
Oranzeb
Marzio
Onorio
Ulpiano
Martin Pecheur
Sansonnet
Courlis
Brassac
Coq
The Condor
Tancarville
Cloridano
Souci
Upas
Omnium II
Arizona
Elf
Marsan
Pitti
Sea Sick
Nimbus
Rural
Ivoire
Acheron
Massina
Atleta
Ranquel
Bocage
Ob
Kummel
Dauphin
Hero
Hareng
Cerbere
Tourmalet
Guillame Le Taciturne
Dutch Skater
Insulaire
Thomery
Burgomaster
Dutch Roller
Sherbrooke
Yellow
Daphnis
Dandolo
Accumulator
Massinissa
Jarnac
Old Tom

See also
List of leading Thoroughbred racehorses

References

External links
 Thoroughbred Bloodlines:The Flying Dutchman
 Pedigree Query

1846 racehorse births
1870 racehorse deaths
Racehorses bred in the United Kingdom
Racehorses trained in the United Kingdom
Epsom Derby winners
Thoroughbred family 3-i
Byerley Turk sire line
St Leger winners